Shukri Abrahams (22 October 1968 – 3 February 2019) was a South African cricketer. He played in four first-class matches in 1986/87 to 1987/88 for Eastern Province. Following his playing career, he became a cricket coach at the Western Cape Sports School. Abrahams was killed in a car crash on the N2 road between Storms River and Humansdorp.

See also
 List of Eastern Province representative cricketers

References

1968 births
2019 deaths
South African cricketers
Eastern Province cricketers
Cricketers from Port Elizabeth
Road incident deaths in South Africa